Steve Orens is a Paralympian athlete from Belgium competing mainly in category T52 long-distance events.

Steve competed in the 1992 Paralympics in Barcelona in the TW3 class 400m and 800m and the combined TW3-4 1500m and 5000m. It was in the 1996 Summer Paralympics in Atlanta that he won his medals, a gold in the T52 800m and silvers in the T52-53 5000m and 10000m.

External links
 profile on paralympic.org

Paralympic athletes of Belgium
Athletes (track and field) at the 1996 Summer Paralympics
Athletes (track and field) at the 2000 Summer Paralympics
Paralympic gold medalists for Belgium
Paralympic silver medalists for Belgium
Living people
Medalists at the 1996 Summer Paralympics
Medalists at the 2000 Summer Paralympics
Year of birth missing (living people)
Paralympic medalists in athletics (track and field)
Belgian male wheelchair racers